The Gashi is a  river located in Tropojë, northern Albania.
The nature reserve forms a part of the European Green Belt and has been declared a UNESCO World Heritage Site within the Primeval Beech Forests of the Carpathians and Other Regions of Europe.

It originates at  the Dobërdol Pass  and flows through numerous peaks including the Trekufiri  in the north, Maja Bogiçaj  in the northeast and Maja e Shpatit  in the northwest. The various streams, flowing first to the north and northwest, merge with the Dobërdol pasture in the northwest, than leaving the basin westward. Few kilometres further the river changes its course southwards and stops the direction in the sequence. It passes the Maja e Shkëlzenit  on its western side. Farther south, the river passes through a narrow gorge and valley to the Tropoja basin, where the river below flows into the Valbonë river.

The climate is subarctic and oceanic, having cool summers and generally cold winters. Forests occupy the majority of the region's area. The region falls within the Balkan mixed forests and Dinaric Mountains mixed forests terrestrial ecoregion of the Palearctic temperate broadleaf and mixed forests biome. The river is particularly known for the diversity of flora and fauna and is surrounded by swamps and canals that drain the whole local basin such as the region of Malësia e Gashit within the Albanian Alps into the Adriatic sea. Forests occupy the majority of the total area.

The diverse flora is characterized with high endemism due to the combination of southern geographic latitude and high altitude variation. The forests are host to several plants such as beech, macedonian pine, bosnian pine, norway spruce, and silver fir. The fauna is represented by 64 species of mammals, such as the brown bear, gray wolf, chamois, lynx, roe deer, wild boar, western capercaillie, golden eagle,  eurasian otter and 14 species of amphibians.

See also  
 Geography of Albania 
 Protected areas of Albania
 World Heritage Sites in Albania
 Central Mountain Range
 Valbonë river
 Rivers of Albania

References 

Nature reserves in Albania
Rivers of Albania
World Heritage Sites in Albania
Tourist attractions in Albania
Geography of Kukës County
Primeval Beech Forests in Europe
Forests of Albania
Valbonë Valley National Park